A cantilena (Italian for "lullaby" and Latin for "old, familiar song") is a vocal melody or instrumental passage in a smooth, lyrical style.

References 

Classical music styles